Kitty is a wooden Thames sailing barge in the bowsprit class of 65 tons. She was built in Harwich in 1895. She is No. 209 on the National Historic Ships Register.

Construction
There were two branches of the Horlocks family operating from Mistley. The business was grain- bringing imported Canadian grain from London to the flour mills in Essex.
Horatio (‘Raish’) Horlock and three co-owners ordered the Kitty, he however had most of the shares

Thames barges were built for strength: Kitty was known for her speed. They had flat bottoms to allow them to be easily beached or lie on the river mud, and were rigged to allow them to be operated by two men and possibly a lad. They were built in bargeyards adjacent to a river or creek on bargeblocks- a series of trestles raised about a metre from the compacted ground, that allowed working access above and below.

She is almost identical in size and layout to the well documented Kathleen. She has a double-skinned hull of oak frames and  oak floors, with 3-inch ( doubled) and solid  pitch pine planking.

History
Kitty was built for transporting grain from London and Ipswich, but could also ship timber, malt, flour, bricks, grit and general cargoes. She was generally an estuary barge not working the East Coast or the channel.

In the First World War she transported coke and stores to Calais and Boulogne for the army then reverted to the London river and the Essex coast.  She was sold in 1933 to Francis and Gilders Ltd, of Colchester, who in March 1951 merged with the London and Rochester Trading Company. She traded solely under sail until July 1955. During this period in 1949 she was involved in an accident in the Surrey Commercial Docks when her deck cargo shifted and she took a sudden list and lost it colliding with the motor coaster Grampian Coast. Though this damaged her stem, it was patched up and was sold. She then was derigged and worked as a timber lighter for Brown & Co, of Chelmsford, on the Blackwater.

In 1964 John Fairbrother, trading as Maldon Yacht & Barge Charter Co Ltd, bought and was re-rigged and refurbished as a twelve berth charter vessel. He raced her
in the revived barge matches. She took a first in the 1974 Pin Mill class B, and in the 1975 Medway bowsprit class. Then she was bought in 1976 by David Anderson who de-rigged her and used her as floating restaurant at Hayling Island. In April 1985 she was bought was Patrick Keen of Portsmouth who re-rigged her and installed a Perkins six-cylinder diesel engine and she became a charter yacht again: now named My Kitty. In 1988 ownership passed to Microwave Exhibitions and Publishers Ltd. and in 1990 she was bought by Roger Marriott, and was renamed Kitty. She was based on the Solent and used for charter work.

In 2003 she had a new mainsail cut by James Lawrence, of Brightlingsea and she was refitted at Maldon in 2006. She has eight berths, and is licensed to take 46 passengers (plus four crew) to sea. In September 2007 she relocated to Maldon.

Gallery

See also

 List of active Thames sailing barges

References

Bibliography
 
 

Kitty
1895 ships
Individual sailing vessels
Ships built in Harwich
Transport on the River Thames
Sailing ships of the United Kingdom
Ships and vessels on the National Register of Historic Vessels